Audra Vau (birth name Audronė Vaupšienė) is a Lithuanian transdisciplinarity artist born in 1970 in Vilnius, Lithuania. She lives and works mostly in Vilnius, Lithuania and London.

Audra Vau was born in 1970 in Lithuania and studied in National M. K. Čiurlionis School of Art, Vilnius, Lithuania. She works with the idea of performativity of nature and landscape and uses video and photography.

Exhibitions
She has exhibited numerous times at the Contemporary Art Centre Vilnius (2000, 2001, 2013), Jonas Mekas Center, Vilnius (2011, solo) Christine Koning gallery, Vienna (2013), Max Lust Gallery, Vienna (2015, solo.

1998: "Three portraits of the artist" as magazine page-project with Raimundas Malašauskas
2000: "Innocent Life" at the Contemporary Art Centre, Vilnius
2001: "Walls for NATO" (with Evaldas Jansas) at the Contemporary Art Centre, Vilnius
2001: "Light" (with Evaldas Jansas) at the Contemporary Art Centre, Vilnius
2011: "Audronė Vaupšienė: Three Stories" at the Jonas Mekas Visual Arts Center, Vilnius
2013: Group exhibition at the Contemporary Art Centre, Vilnius
2014: Group exhibition at the Christine Konig Gallery, Vienna 
2015: Upcoming solo exhibition at the Max Lust Gallery, Vienna

Her upcoming exhibition will take place during Venice Biennale 2015 -"Edge of Chaos" together with Gianluca Malgeri and LaToya Frazier, curated by Vita Zaman and Nicola Vassel.

References 

1970 births
Lithuanian photographers
Living people
Lithuanian women photographers